Ladybird is the second studio album by Shit and Shine, released on 17 October 2005 by Latitudes. Featuring four drummers and two bassists, the album contains a lengthy forty-two minute improvisation built on a repetitive drum pattern.

Track listing

Personnel
Adapted from the Ladybird liner notes.
Shit and Shine
 Craig Clouse – vocals, instruments

Production and additional personnel
 Harvey Birrell – recording, mixing, mastering

Release history

References

External links 
 

2005 albums
Shit and Shine albums